Edginton is a surname. Notable people with the surname include:

Barrie Edginton (born 1967), British windsurfer
Ian Edginton, British graphic novelist
May Edginton (1883–1957), British writer